Walter James "Livy" Livingston (November 19, 1884 – December 3, 1970) was an American football, basketball, and track coach and college athletics administrator. He served as the head football coach at Denison University from 1911 to 1926, compiling a record of 76–44–12. Livingston was also the head basketball coach at Denison from 1911 to 1936, tallying a mark of 226–132. He was the athletic director at Denison from 1911 to 1952.

Head coaching record

Football

References

External links
 

1884 births
1970 deaths
American football fullbacks
American football tackles
American men's basketball players
Denison Big Red athletic directors
Denison Big Red baseball players
Denison Big Red football coaches
Denison Big Red football players
Denison Big Red men's basketball coaches
Denison Big Red men's basketball players
College track and field coaches in the United States